Neratovice is a town in Mělník District in the Central Bohemian Region of the Czech Republic. It has about 16,000 inhabitants. It is an industrial town.

Administrative parts
Villages of Byškovice, Horňátky, Korycany, Lobkovice and Mlékojedy are administrative parts of Neratovice.

Geography
It lies in a flat landscape in the Central Elbe Table. The Elbe River flows through the town. A notable body of water is the flooded sandstone quarry Mlékojedy.

History

The first written mention of Neratovice is from 1227, at that time known as Neradice. It was a serf village of Chapter of St. Wenceslaus at the Prague Castle and of St. George's Convent in Prague. In the second half of the 14th century, it became a property of the Archbishopric of Prague. At the beginning of the 15th century, Neratovice was purchased by the Lobkowicz family and remained their owners for most of the time in the following centuries.

Thanks to the industrial revolution, Neratovice developed significantly in the second half of the 19th century. In 1865, the first train passed through the village along the Turnov–Kralupy line. In 1872, a line from Prague connected to it and a railway station was built. In 1874, a post office was established in Neratovice. In 1880, Neratovice separated from Lobkovice and became an independent municipality. In 1898, the railway to Brandýs nad Labem was put into operation. In 1900, a factory for the production of oil, degrass, soap and candles (later known as Lachema) was established. In 1905, a chemical factory focused especially on ammonia production (later known as Spolana) was established. Villas were built and the Neratovice region became a recreational area, especially for the inhabitants of Prague.

Until 1918, Neratovice was part of the Austrian monarchy (Austria side after the compromise of 1867), in the Karolinenthal (Karlín) district, one of the 94 Bezirkshauptmannschaften in Bohemia.

In 1950, an independent national enterprise Spolana Neratovice was established. In 1957, Neratovice officially became a town and the villages of Libiš, Byškovice, Lobkovice, Horňátky, Mlékojedy and Korycany were gradually associated with them. In cooperation with Spolana, a new "modern" panel-type town with abundant social facilities was intensively built. The population grew up as people were coming to Neratovice for work and housing. In 1990, Libiš became an independent municipality again.

Demographics

Economy

The town is known as an industrial centre. The main company is Spolana chemical plant.

Sights
The main historical monument is the Lobkovice Castle in Lobkovice. The original fortress was rebuilt into a Renaissance castle in 1610 at the latest. Only a tower survived the Thirty Years' War. A new Baroque castle was added to the tower in 1679 and in this form the castle has been preserved to this day. Today the castle is owned by the Lobkowicz family and is closed to the public until the reconstruction is completed.

Notable people
František Palacký (1798–1876), historian and politician; stayed here in 1852–1860 and is buried here

Twin towns – sister cities

Neratovice is twinned with:
 Radeberg, Germany

References

External links

Cities and towns in the Czech Republic
Socialist planned cities
Populated riverside places in the Czech Republic
Populated places on the Elbe